Ô Môn is an urban district (quận) of Cần Thơ in the Mekong Delta region of Vietnam. As of 2004 the district had a population of 128,075, and 164,234 people in 2018. The district covers an area of 126 km2.

The district was created by Decree No. 05/2004/ND-CP dated January 2, 2004.

Wards 

The administration consists of 7 wards:

 Châu Văn Liêm Ward: 22,719 people (2007)
 Thới Hòa Ward: 7,766 people (2007)
 An Thới Ward: 26,474 people (2004)
 Phước Thới Ward: 20,193 people (2004)
 Trường Lạc Ward: 15,803 people (2004)
 Thới Long Ward: 20,609 people (2007)
 Long Hưng Ward: 14,029 people (2007)

References

Districts of Cần Thơ